Suriname participated at the 2018 Summer Youth Olympics in Buenos Aires, Argentina from 6 October to 18 October 2018.

Athletics

 2 quotas

Field events

Swimming

 1 quota

References

2018 in Surinamese sport
Nations at the 2018 Summer Youth Olympics
Suriname at the Youth Olympics